Vĩnh Châu is a county-level town (thị xã) of Sóc Trăng province in the Mekong Delta region of Vietnam. On August 25, 2011, Vĩnh Châu became a town and had a population of 163,918. The town covers an area of 473 km2.

Administrative divisions

 4 phường (wards):
Phường 1
Phường 2
Khánh Hoà
Vĩnh Phước
 6 xã (communes):
 Hoà Đông
 Lạc Hoà
 Lai Hoà
 Vĩnh Hải
 Vĩnh Hiệp
 Vĩnh Tân

References

Districts of Sóc Trăng province
County-level towns in Vietnam